Rech is a region in Chitral district, located in the Hindu Kush area of Pakistan.

References

Populated places in Chitral District
Hill stations in Pakistan
Populated places along the Silk Road
Chitral District